Castle Craig Rock is a prominent geological feature to the south of Kawhia Harbour in the Waikato region of New Zealand. Castle Craig Rock is a type of flaggy Limestone (sandstone). It stands 610 feet (186m) above sea level and provides an expansive view of Castle Craig Farm, an organic beef farm, plus the little town of Awamarino.

In the 1920s the owner of Castle Craig Farm, which is where the rock is located, named it Castle Craig Rock because he thought it looked very similar to Castlecraig in Black Isle in northern Scotland.

The rock formation is mentioned in the magazine "New Zealand Journal of Geology and Geophysics 1967 Vol.10 No.4" by PJ Barrett, where he mentions the pebble band in the flaggy limestone.
In March, 2019 the surrounding farm hosted a 250 km 4WD off-road race organized by the Waikato Off Road Racing Club.

See also
 Mangapohue Natural Bridge

References

External links

 View seen from Stone Table

Waitomo District
Rock formations of Waikato